The Hotel Clark, also known as the Clark Hotel, is a historic building in Los Angeles, California, USA.

Location
The building is located at 426 South Hill Street in Downtown Los Angeles. It is between 4th Street and Hill Street, near Pershing Square.

History
The eleven-story building was built by Eli P. Clark. It was completed in 1914. It was a 555-room hotel. Later, the hotel turned into a low-rent apartment building. 

It was acquired by JCG Financial Co., followed by Sunday Inn Inc.. When they tried to evict the tenants and turn it into a luxury hotel again in 1979, the tenants filed a lawsuit accusing them of harassment and won. A decade later, in 1988, the building was acquired by the People's Republic of China under the company name of May Wah International Enterprises. Their goal was to turn it into "a Chinese business/cultural center". While the historic facade was preserved, the interior was redesigned in the International Style. When diplomatic relations between the US and China fizzled out, it was turned into a low-rent apartment building. When they tried to evict the residents to raise the rents, they were sued, leading to a US$1.7 million settlement.

It is owned by the Chetrit Group, chaired by Joseph Chetrit. They have been remodelling it into a hotel since 2012.

References

Buildings and structures in Downtown Los Angeles
Commercial buildings completed in 1914